Csaba Cserép (born 26 August 1982) is a Hungarian sailor. He competed in the men's 470 event at the 2004 Summer Olympics.

References

External links
 

1982 births
Living people
Hungarian male sailors (sport)
Olympic sailors of Hungary
Sailors at the 2004 Summer Olympics – 470
Sportspeople from Budapest